Mount Somers is a small town in Canterbury, New Zealand, nestled in the foothills of the Southern Alps.  The population in the 2001 census was 2,307. Due to its scenic location, it has seen growth in the number of holiday homes.

Unlike many country towns in New Zealand, Mount Somers' economy has not been solely agricultural.  Coal, clay, sand, and limestone have been mined in the hills behind the town, and from 1885 until 1968 the community and its industries were served by the Mount Somers Branch railway from the Main South Line. From 1889 to 1957 an extension ran to Springburn, and the branch was sometimes known as the Springburn Branch.  From Mount Somers railway station a private bush tramway ran into the hills behind the town, providing access to the various industrial operations there.  Relics of both the railway and tramway are still visible today.

Mount Somers is famous amongst the international experimental and underground music communities as it is the home of Peter King and his lathe cut record business. Peter hand cuts records onto polycarbonate plastic one at a time using an old BBC lathe and also home made record cutting heads.

Demographics
It is part of the Ashburton Forks statistical area. 

Mount Somers had a population of 147 at the 2018 New Zealand census, an increase of 12 people (8.9%) since the 2013 census, and an increase of 30 people (25.6%) since the 2006 census. There were 63 households. There were 75 males and 72 females, giving a sex ratio of 1.04 males per female. The median age was 45.4 years (compared with 37.4 years nationally), with 33 people (22.4%) aged under 15 years, 15 (10.2%) aged 15 to 29, 72 (49.0%) aged 30 to 64, and 27 (18.4%) aged 65 or older.

Ethnicities were 95.9% European/Pākehā, 8.2% Māori, and 2.0% Pacific peoples (totals add to more than 100% since people could identify with multiple ethnicities).

Although some people objected to giving their religion, 53.1% had no religion, 38.8% were Christian and 2.0% were Buddhist.

Of those at least 15 years old, 15 (13.2%) people had a bachelor or higher degree, and 27 (23.7%) people had no formal qualifications. The median income was $24,600, compared with $31,800 nationally. The employment status of those at least 15 was that 57 (50.0%) people were employed full-time, 21 (18.4%) were part-time, and 3 (2.6%) were unemployed.

Education
Mt Somers Springburn School is a full primary school catering for years 1 to 8. It has  students as of  The school opened in 1876.

References

External links

 Mt Somers & Highcountry
 Railways of New Zealand: Mount Somers Tramway and the Mount Somers/Springburn Branch

High Country stations
Ashburton District
Populated places in Canterbury, New Zealand